The eighth World Cup of Softball will be held between July 11–14 in Oklahoma City, Oklahoma USA. The competing national teams will be the United States, Puerto Rico, Japan, Australia, Canada.

Standings

Schedule
all times CDT

Championship
all times CDT
The fourth and fifth-place finishers will play, the loser finishes in fifth, the winner plays for third place against the third-place finisher. The top two finishers play for the championship. The fourth-place finisher advanced directly to the third place game due to rain.

References

World Cup of Softball
2013 in softball